Mouth Moods is the third mashup album by American musician and comedian Neil Cicierega released in 2017. Like his previous mashup albums Mouth Sounds and Mouth Silence, its source material is primarily Top 40 hits from the late 20th and early 21st centuries. Samples from Smash Mouth's "All Star" return, after being absent outside of Easter eggs in Mouth Silence. A fourth installment to the Mouth series, Mouth Dreams, was released in 2020.

Reception 
Mouth Moods was praised for being "just as compelling" as its predecessors, as well as for its usage of various songs in pop culture history, as well as its "enhanced orchestral scope" over the previous two albums.

The album includes the innuendo-filled track "Bustin", based on the Ray Parker Jr. song "Ghostbusters", which became a viral hit. The publication OC Weekly stated that it was "[a]bsolutely brilliant how an entirely new track can be created from the original elements while still containing its fun vibe." As of December 7, 2022, the album has over 1.62 million listens on SoundCloud, with the aforementioned "Bustin" having over 15.5 million views on YouTube.

Track listing

References

External links

Mouth Moods on Internet Archive

Mashup albums
Smash Mouth
2017 mixtape albums
2017 remix albums
Barenaked Ladies
Neil Cicierega remix albums